António Filipe Lopes Ribeiro (16 April 1908 in Lisbon – 1995) was a Portuguese film director.

Son of Manuel Henrique Correia da Silva Ribeiro and wife Ester da Nazaré Lopes, he was the older brother of actor Ribeirinho.

Filmography
Dia de Portugal na Expo'70 (1970)
Portugal de Luto na Morte de Salazar (1970)
Portugal na Expo'70 (1970)
Casa Bancária Pinto de Magalhães (1963)
Instituto de Oncologia (1963)
I Salão de Antiguidades, O (1963)
Artes ao Serviço da Nação, As (1962)
Arte Sacra (1960)
Indústrias Regionais (1960)
Monumentos de Belém, Os (1960)
Mosteiros Portugueses (1960)
Primo Basílio, O (1959)
Comemorações Nacionais (1958)
Portugal na Exposição Universal de Bruxelas (1958)
30 Anos com Salazar (1957)
A Gloriosa Viagem ao Brasil (1957)
A Rainha Isabel II em Portugal (1957)
A Viagem Presidencial ao Brasil (1957)
A Visita a Portugal da Rainha Isabel II da Grã Bretanha (1957)
A Visita do Ministro Paulo Cunha aos Portugueses da Califórnia (1956)
A Visita do Chefe do Estado à Ilha da Madeira (1955)
Cortejos de Oferendas (1953)
Jubileu de Salazar, O (1953)
A Viagem Presidencial a Espanha (1953)
A Celebração do 28 de Maio de 1952 (1952)
Rodas de Lisboa, As (1951)
Frei Luís de Sousa (1950)
Algarve d'Além-Mar (1950)
Casas para Trabalhadores (1950)
A Festa dos Tabuleiros em Tomar (1950)
Segurança Social e Assistência Médica (1950)
Serviços Médico-Sociais (1950)
Trabalho e Previdência (1950)
Estampas Antigas de Portugal (1949)
Só Tem Varíola Quem Quer (1949)
Lisboa de Hoje e de Amanhã (1948)
Anjos e Demónios (1947)
Cortejo Histórico de Lisboa, O (1947)
A Vizinha do Lado (1945)
Ilhas Crioulas de Cabo Verde, As (1945)
A Morte e a Vida do Engenheiro Duarte Pacheco (1944)
Inauguração do Estádio Nacional (1944)
Amor de Perdição (1943)
Portugal na Exposição de Paris de 1937 (1942)
The Tyrant Father (1941)
Feitiço do Império (1940)
Guiné, Berço do Império (1940)
Viagem de Sua Excelência o Presidente da República a Angola (1939)
Exposição Histórica da Ocupação (1938)
A Revolução de Maio (1937)
Fogos Reais na Escola Prática de Infantaria (1935)
 Wild Cattle (1934)
A Preparação do Filme 'Gado Bravo''' (1933)Curso de Oficiais Milicianos em Mafra (1932)Uma Batida em Malpique (1929)Bailando ao Sol (1928)

External links

Bibliographic references
  O Cais do Olhar'' by José de Matos-Cruz, Portuguese Cinematheque, 1999

1908 births
1995 deaths
Portuguese film directors
People from Lisbon
Portuguese people of Brazilian descent